Marko Jelača (born 15 December 1982) is a Georgian water polo player for CC Ortigia and the Georgian national team.

He participated at the 2018 Men's European Water Polo Championship.

References

1982 births
Living people
Male water polo players from Georgia (country)
Expatriate water polo players
Expatriate sportspeople from Georgia (country) in Italy